Antigonia also transliterated as Antigonea and Antigoneia was a Hellenistic city in Seleucid Empire, Syria (in modern Turkey), on the Orontes, founded by Antigonus I Monophthalmus in 307 BC, and intended to be the capital of his empire; the site is approximately 7 km northeast of Antakya, Hatay Province, Turkey. After the Battle of Ipsus, 301 BC, in which Antigonus perished, the inhabitants of Antigonia were removed by his successful rival Seleucus I Nicator to the city of Antioch, which Seleucus founded a little lower down the river. (Strabo xvi. p. 750; Diod. xx. 47; Liban. Antioch. p. 349; Malalas, p. 256.) Diodorus erroneously says that the inhabitants were removed to Seleucia Pieria. Antigonia continued, however, to exist, and is mentioned in the war with the Parthians after the defeat of Crassus. (Dion Cass. xl. 29.)

In the city there was a shrine with four pillars, a statue of Tyche was placed above it, and a tall altar in front of it.

References

External links
Smith, William (editor); Dictionary of Greek and Roman Geography, "Antigoneia", London, (1854)
"Antiocheia" in the same source
Hazlitt, Classical Gazetteer, "Antigonia"

307 BC
Populated places established in the 4th century BC
Archaeological sites in Hatay Province
Ancient Greek archaeological sites in Turkey
Antigonid colonies
Seleucid Empire
Former populated places in Turkey
Geography of Hatay Province
300s BC establishments